Yeghia Dndesian (born Istanbul, Ottoman Turkey 1834 - died Constantinople, Ottoman Turkey 1881) was an Armenian musician and musical reformer.

Work 
Yeghia Dndesian was among the cultivators of the Sharagan musical style and notation used throughout Armenian churches and religious services. He was instrumental in resurfacing much of the lost information of ancient Armenian music. In April 1873, a committee consisting of priests, clergymen, and scribes arrived in Constantinople to gather, revise, or recompose Sharagan melodies in order to preserve them for notation. Dndesian was chosen as a member of the committee along with Nigoghos Tashjian, and Aristakes Hovannesian (1812-1878). After putting much work, Dndesian eventually published a five volume book in 1871 entitled Sharagan Tzainakryal or Sharagan Notations.

References 

Musicians from Istanbul
Armenian composers
Armenians from the Ottoman Empire
Composers from the Ottoman Empire
19th-century people from the Ottoman Empire
1834 births
1881 deaths
19th-century classical composers
Male classical composers
19th-century male musicians